Pioneer Sector is part of the Jurong Industrial Estate which is the largest industrial estate in Singapore.
 
Pioneer Sector comprises Pioneer Sectors 1, 2, 3, Pioneer Sector Walk, Pioneer Sector Lane and Gul Road and is bounded by Pioneer Road on the North, Tuas Basin on the West, Selat Jurong on the South and Gul Basin on the East. It is located on reclaimed land.

Pioneer Sector is home to many marine and heavy industries such as Keppel Offshore and Marine, Asia-Beni Steel Industries Pte Ltd, YLS Steel Pte Ltd, Keppel Shipyard etc. Tuas Naval Base is also located at Pioneer Sector.

Transport

SBS Transit industrial service 257 travels between Joo Koon Bus Interchange/Joo Koon MRT station and Pioneer Sector. Bus service 254 plies Pioneer Road which bounded the Northern part of Pioneer Sector.

Neighbouring Areas

Places in Singapore
West Region, Singapore